The Bolivarian Communication and Information System (SiBCI) is a conglomerate of Venezuela state media that manages public radio, television, and multimedia attached to the Ministry of Popular Power for Communication and Information. It is located on channel 24.3 in Digital Terrestrial Television in Venezuela.

Public media
After reviewing the possible reach and penetration of the different types of media, the Venezuelan government decided to assign specific functions:

Television

Local television
Avila TV - Broadcasts began in July 2006 .

National television
Venezolana de Television - News, broadcasts began in August 1964.
TVes - Generalist, started broadcasting in May 2007.
ViVe - Educational and Cultural broadcasts began in November 2003.

International television
TeleSUR - News and culture international broadcasts began in July 2005.

Radio

Local radio
Alba Ciudad 96.3
Ciudad VLC Radio 89.9FM

National radio
Radio Nacional de Venezuela (RNV) - began broadcasting in July 1936.
RNV Information Channel
RNV Classic Channel
RNV Musical Channel
Indigenous RNV Channel
RNV Youth Channel
RNV Regional Channels: Central Region, Los Llanos Region 
International RNV Channel.

YVKE Mundial Radio

International radio
Radio of the South - Broadcast in Spanish, Portuguese, English and French.

Newspapers
Correo del Orinoco - launched in 2009 with versions in Spanish and English.
Ciudad CCS - launched in 2009.
Ciudad VLC - launched in Valencia in 2012.
Ciudad Cojedes - launched in San Carlos on 23 October 2013.
Ciudad Guárico - launched in San Juan de los Morros.
Ciudad Petare - released in Petare.

Multimedia
 Agencia Venezolana de Noticias - created in 2005 with versions in Spanish and English.

Other

National Assembly media
Asamblea Nacional Televisión (ANTV) - Transmission Assembly broadcasts began in March 2005.
AN Radio - starts broadcasting in 2009, broadcasting in radio the sessions of the National Assembly.

References

 
Venezuelan propaganda organizations